The Jadoon (also Gadoon) (Hindko/) is a Pashtun tribe in Pakistan, partly in Gadoon in Swabi, and partly in Abbottabad and Haripur districts of Khyber Pakhtunkhwa province. Across the Durand line, some members of the tribe live in Nangarhar and Kunar in Afghanistan. 

The Jadoons speak Pashto in Swabi and Afghanistan and Hindko in Abbottabad and Haripur. The Jadoons are subdivided into three clans: Salar, Mansoor and Hassanzai.

History
The Jadoons originally lived on the western slopes of the Spin Ghar range, in the Nangarhar region of Afghanistan. Later on, the Jadoons migrated eastwards, and allied with the Yusufzai tribe of the Afghans, who had recently migrated to Peshawar after their expulsion from Kabul by Mirza Ulugh Beg, a paternal uncle of the Mughal Emperor Babur. The Jadoons and the Yusufzai migrated further northeastwards into areas settled by the Dilazak tribe of the Afghans. They succeeded to defeat the Dilazaks at the battle of Katlang, and pushed them towards the Hazara region east of the Indus River. The Jadoons eventually settled in Swabi at the western bank of the Indus River. But later, some of the Jadoons also settled on the eastern bank of the Indus River, in Abbottabad and Haripur.

The British Raj period
In 1841 J. Forbes and John William Kaye said the following with reference to the Jadoons who lived in the tribal areas outside the limits of British India.

People
Iqbal Khan Jadoon, former Governor of Khyber Pakhtunkhwa
Amanullah Khan Jadoon, former Federal Minister of Pakistan
Tariq Jadoon, White House Rajoya Jadoon Chowck Karachi
Muttahida Karwan-e-Jadoon Pakistan

See also
 Nimat Allah al-Harawi  Author of Tarikh-i-Khan Jahani Makhzan-i-Afghani (The History of the Afghans).

References

 "Tazkara Sarfaroshan e Sarhad" by Muhammad Shafi Sabir.
 "The Jadoons" by Sultan Khan Jadoon (2001).
 Sir Olaf Caroe, his book "The Pathans".
 "Afghan" by Muhammad Asif Fitrat

Pashtun tribes
Gharghashti Pashtun tribes
Surnames
Pakistani names